Robert Arnold (born November 12, 1988) was an American professional basketball player for Crailsheim Merlins of Germany's Basketball Bundesliga.

Personal life

Arnold was born in Lancaster, California. He attended Lancaster High School and went on to graduate from Boise State University in Boise, ID. Upon graduation, Arnold went on to have a successful career playing for multiple elite European leagues.

Career
Arnold played two years for the Boise State Broncos and turned professional in 2011. After that he played two years for the Allianz Swans Gmunden, where he scored 15.5 points per game in his last season.

After his stance in Austria, he left for Namika Lahti in the Finnish Korisliiga. After a successful individual season, in which Arnold averaged 18.6 points a game, he signed with the Finnish powerhouse Kataja Basket Club for the 2014–15 season. With Kataja he won the Finnish Korisliiga.

On June 19, 2015, he signed a one-year deal with Belgian club Belfius Mons-Hainaut.

On July 23, 2016, Arnold joined Rethymno Cretan Kings. The following season, Arnold joined Hyères-Toulon of France's LNB Pro A.

In 2017, Arnold signed a 2 year deal to play for JDA Dijon in France, but was released from the team in November 2018 for failing to be a team player and poor attitude. On December 12, 2018, he has signed contract with Crailsheim Merlins of Germany's Basketball Bundesliga. In May 2019, Arnold was officially released from the Merlins for poor attitude and inability to function after an elbow injury left him unable to shoot.

References

External links
Robert Arnold at eurobasket.com
 Robert Arnold at fiba.com
Robert Arnold at fibaeurope.com

1988 births
Living people
American expatriate basketball people in Austria
American expatriate basketball people in Finland
American expatriate basketball people in France
American expatriate basketball people in Greece
American men's basketball players
Antelope Valley Marauders men's basketball players
Basketball players from California
Boise State Broncos men's basketball players
Crailsheim Merlins players
JDA Dijon Basket players
People from Lancaster, California
Rethymno B.C. players
Small forwards
Swans Gmunden players